Hasnain Lehri is a Pakistani Actor / Fashion Model. He has won multiple awards as a Actor and Model, Hasnain Lehri is the only super model who has won five LUX Style Award in the History of Pakistani fashion / Entertainment industry. Also, he has set a record of receiving four consecutive awards at the Lux Style Awards, (Winning Year) LSA 2015, 2016, 2017 and 2018, and again at LSA 2020. Lehri was chosen as one of the Top 100 Sexiest Asian Men in a poll conducted by Eastern Eye in 2017.

Awards and nominations

References

External links
 
 

1984 births
Living people
People from Lahore
Baloch people
Pakistani male models
People from Balochistan, Pakistan
People from Karachi